The Worshipful Company of Scientific Instrument Makers is one of the 110 livery companies of the City of London. It ranks 84th in the order of precedence for the livery companies.

History 
The Company was originally formed in 1956 when science and manufacturing were key to the UK economy  and the memory of war time defence requirements were still fresh and the UK was a large-scale manufacturer of specialist electronic and mechanical scientific instruments. It is one of the Modern Livery Companies formed since 1926 having been granted its livery status by the City in 1963. It is hoped a Royal Charter may be granted in 2019.

As with the original Livery Companies it supports the profession and the craft of scientific instrument making, this is achieved through the exchange of ideas and information between members and guests, and also by its charitable donations supporting those in or retired from the profession.

The Company shares Glazier's Hall with two other Companies. The Hall was originally a tea warehouse and is built into the structure of London Bridge. Along with the Gunmakers it one of only two Livery Halls outside the boundary of the City of London, albeit only a short way outside.

The Livery has a long-standing connection with the Institute of Measurement and Control, the Scientific Instrument Society and a number of other bodies related to measurement. It is also linked to the Bridge Ward Club.

The history of the Company has been documented in two publications created by Past Masters and these can be downloaded here.

Coat of Arms
The coat of arms includes two key figures from the area of scientific instrument making, Sir Isaac Newton and Michael Faraday. The crest is Minerva the Roman Goddess of wisdom and strategic warfare. It is featured in a stained glass window in the Company church St Margaret Lothbury.

Membership and Governance 

Members, although from diverse areas such as nanotechnology, mechanical engineering, genetics and astronomy, industry and academia, must be connected to science or engineering in some way in order to join.

The Company has five levels of membership. Younger members (from 16 years old) who are still studying or in training can be Apprentices. This enables them to receive financial and/or mentoring support. The next level of membership is Scholar for those in Higher education researching instrumentation. The next is Freeman, usually someone who is early in their career; then up to Liveryman who are established in their profession and eligible to serve on the Court and progress to Master. Occasionally Honorary Freemen are admitted as a result of serving the Company or profession in some significant way.

References

External links
 The Scientific Instrument Makers' Company website

Scientific Instrument Makers
 
1956 establishments in England